Quercus oxyodon is a tree species in the beech family Fagaceae. It is native to the Himalayas (Nepal, Sikkim, Bhutan, Assam, Tibet, Myanmar) and to the mountains of southern China (Guangdong, Guangxi, Guizhou, Hubei, Hunan, Jiangxi, Shaanxi, Sichuan, Yunnan, Zhejiang) and the Sa Pa region of northern Vietnam (as Q. songtavanensis).  It is placed in subgenus Cerris, section Cyclobalanopsis.

Quercus oxyodon is a tree up to 20 m tall. Leaves can be as much as 220 mm long.

References

External links
line drawing, Flora of China Illustrations vol. 4, fig. 383, drawings 5-7 at lower right and lower left
Forestry Nepal

oxyodon
Flora of Asia
Flora of Indo-China
Plants described in 1863
Trees of China
Trees of Nepal
Trees of Vietnam